Konstantinos or Constantinos (Κωνσταντίνος, Konstantínos) is a Greek male given name.
  
 Konstantinos (born 1972), occultist
 Konstantinos "Kosta" Barbarouses (born 1990), New Zealand footballer
 Konstantinos Chalkias (born 1974), Greek footballer
 Konstadinos Gatsioudis (born 1973), Greek athlete
 Konstantinos Gavras (born 1933), Greek-French filmmaker
 Konstantinos Kanaris (1790–1877), Greek admiral and statesman, former Prime Minister of Greece
 Konstantinos Karamanlis (1907–1998), former Prime Minister and President of Greece 
 Konstantinos Kenteris (born 1973), Greek athlete (sprinter) and Olympic gold medalist
 Konstantinos Koukodimos (born 1969), former Greek athlete and politician
 Konstantinos Logothetopoulos (1878–1961), former Prime Minister of Greece
 Kostas Mitroglou (born 1988), Greek footballer
 Konstantinos Mitsotakis (1918–2017), former Prime Minister of Greece
 Konstantinos Paparrigopoulos (1815–1891), Greek historian
 Konstantinos Psachos (1869–1949), Greek scholar and musicologist
 Konstantinos Simitis (born 1936), former Prime Minister of Greece
 Konstantinos Stephanopoulos (1926–2016), former President of Greece
 Konstantinos Tsaldaris (1884–1970), Greek politician
 Konstantinos Tsatsos (1899–1987), former President of Greece
 Konstantinos Tsiklitiras (1888–1913), Greek athlete and Olympic gold medalist
 Konstadinos Zalagitis (born 1980), Greek athlete (triple jump)

See also
 Konstantin
 Konstantine
 Constantin
 Constantine (name)
 Costas

References

Greek masculine given names